ZoomerMedia Limited is a Canadian media company controlled by Moses Znaimer, the founder of the Citytv network. Originally focusing on properties targeting what the company calls "zoomers", or the 45+ demographic, in 2022, the company began expanding the company's target audience by acquiring youth-focused properties BlogTO and Daily Hive.

History
ZoomerMedia was formed in December 2007 following Znaimer's acquisition and merger of Kemur Publishing, publishers of CARP Magazine, and website operator Fifty-Plus.Net International. It provides marketing, membership, and other services to CARP (formerly the Canadian Association of Retired Persons), of which Znaimer serves as executive director, and publishes Zoomer Magazine (the renamed CARP Magazine). The company also operates several Internet properties including a portal and a social networking site, all targeted to older adult audiences.

In addition, Znaimer previously personally owned a variety of other assets through his privately held company, MZ Media, that were also unofficially considered part of the "ZoomerMedia" group. These included southern Ontario classical music radio stations CFMZ-FM and CFMX-FM (Classical 96 and Classical 103 respectively), adult standards station CFZM Toronto (AM 740), and the annual IdeaCity conference.

In June 2009, ZoomerMedia Limited announced a deal to acquire the broadcasting assets of S-VOX, which includes conventional stations CHNU-TV and CIIT-TV along with specialty channels VisionTV and One: the Body, Mind & Spirit channel, for $25 million. As part of the transaction and a related private placement, Znaimer also merged MZ Media into ZoomerMedia.

Following the transactions (which required the approval of minority shareholders and the Canadian Radio-television and Telecommunications Commission (CRTC), Znaimer owns 66% of the combined company, and insurance company Fairfax Financial owns 28%. All of these transactions were completed on June 30, 2010.

In 2022, ZoomerMedia began acquiring more youth-focused online properties, including BlogTO and Daily Hive.

Assets

Conventional television stations

ZoomerMedia's two conventional stations were part of a television system known as Joytv until August 2013 when CIIT was rebranded as "Hope TV" and dropped all non-religious programming. As Joytv, they were licensed as religious television stations that air religious-based programs in addition to other family friendly and entertainment programs. Both were previously owned by S-VOX. They had previously been a part of the Omni Television system, having been previously owned by Trinity Television before the sale to Rogers. Rogers sold the two stations to S-VOX on March 31, 2008. 
 CHNU-TV, Vancouver, British Columbia (Joytv)
 CIIT-TV, Winnipeg, Manitoba (FAITHTV)

Specialty channels
 VisionTV (Canada) and ZoomerTV (United States)
 ONETV (Canada) and ONETV US (United States)

Radio
CFMZ-FM, Toronto, Ontario (Classical 96)
CFZM, Toronto, Ontario (Zoomer Radio 740AM & 96.7FM)
CFMX-FM, Cobourg, Ontario (Classical 103)
CFMO-FM, Collingwood, Ontario (Classical 102.9)

Magazines
On the Bay Magazine
Tonic Magazine
Zoomer Magazine

Digital
EverythingZoomer.com
 Buzz Connected Media
Daily Hive

Other assets
Fresh Daily Inc
BlogTO
MZTV Museum of Television
MZTV Production & Distribution
ideaCity (Conference)
Marketing / membership operations of CARP
Zoomer Management Limited
ZoomerCard
ZoomerShow

See also
 CHUM Limited – A television broadcast company managed by Moses Znamier from 1981 to 2003.

References

External links
ZoomerMedia

 
Companies listed on the TSX Venture Exchange
Companies based in Toronto
Canadian companies established in 2008
Television broadcasting companies of Canada
Mass media companies established in 2008
2008 establishments in Ontario